The 2023 Northern Ontario Scotties Tournament of Hearts, the Northern Ontario women's curling championship, was held from January 25 to 29 at the Kenora Recreation Centre in Kenora, Ontario. The event was held in conjunction with the 2023 Northern Ontario Men's Provincial Curling Championship, the provincial men's championship. 

The winning Krista McCarville rink represented Northern Ontario at the 2023 Scotties Tournament of Hearts, Canada's national women's curling championship in Kamloops, British Columbia where they won Pool B with a 7–1 record and finished third losing to eventual champion Team Canada 7–5 in the semifinal.

This was the first time this event was held since 2020 due to the COVID-19 pandemic in Ontario. The 2022 event, which was also planned to be held in Kenora had been cancelled.

Teams
The teams are listed as follows:

Round-robin standings
Final round-robin standings

Round-robin results
All draws are listed in Central Time (UTC−06:00).

Draw 1
Wednesday, January 25, 9:30 am

Draw 2
Wednesday, January 25, 2:30 pm

Draw 3
Wednesday, January 25, 7:30 pm

Draw 4
Thursday, January 26, 9:30 am

Draw 5
Thursday, January 26, 2:30 pm

Draw 6
Thursday, January 26, 7:30 pm

Draw 8
Friday, January 27, 2:30 pm

Draw 9
Friday, January 27, 7:30 pm

Draw 10
Saturday, January 28, 9:30 am

Playoffs

Source:

1 vs. 2
Saturday, January 28, 7:30 pm

3 vs. 4
Saturday, January 28, 7:30 pm

Semifinal
Sunday, January 29, 9:30 am

Final
Sunday, January 29, 2:00 pm

References

External links

2023 in Ontario
Curling in Northern Ontario
2023 Scotties Tournament of Hearts
January 2023 sports events in Canada
Sport in Kenora
Ontario Scotties Tournament of Hearts